Phantom aid is what ActionAid describes as aid that never reaches the targeted recipients. This is mostly down to administration costs, as well as aid being used towards commercial ventures. The charity believes that half of all aid fails to reach the poor.

See also
Tied aid
Phantom aid in Afghanistan

References

Aid
Bribery
Embezzlement